Dear God may refer to:

Songs 
 "Dear God" (Patsy Cline song), 1958
 "Dear God" (Elton John song), 1980
 "Dear God" (XTC song), 1986
 "Dear God" (Avenged Sevenfold song), 2008
 "Dear God" (Cory Asbury song), 2020
 "Dear God", by Boyz II Men from Evolution
 "Dear God", by Dax from his 2020 EP I'll Say It For You
 "Dear God", by Midge Ure from Answers to Nothing
 "Dear God", by Nick Jonas from Nicholas Jonas

Other uses 
 Dear God (film), a 1996 American comedy directed by Garry Marshall
 "Dear God" (Touched by an Angel), an episode of the TV series Touched by an Angel
 Dear G-d..., a 2014 album by Being as an Ocean